Vagococcus salmoninarum is a species of bacteria, with type strain NCFB 2777. It is pathogenic towards Oncorhynchus mykiss.

References

Further reading

External links
LPSN

Type strain of Vagococcus salmoninarum at BacDive -  the Bacterial Diversity Metadatabase

Lactobacillales
Bacteria described in 1990